Nicolas Rivenq (born 1958) is a contemporary French baritone.

Born in London, Rivenq studied music at the "École d'Art lyrique" of the Paris Opéra, as well as  the Indiana University.

He has participated in numerous productions of baroque music under the direction of William Christie, and with his ensemble, Les Arts florissants.

He won the Viotti International Music Competition held at Vercelli (Italy) in 1990 by singing extracts from Le nozze di Figaro.

Selected discography 
 André Campra's Grands Motets (Virgin Classics, 2002) 
 Mozart's Idomeneo, re di Creta, KV 366 (Harmonia Mundi, 2008)
 Lully's Atys, at FRA Musica / Harmonia Mundi (Blu-ray)
 Mozart's Così fan tutte (Don Alfonso), BBC / Opus Arte (Blu-ray)
 Bizet, Carmen, Decca (1989)

References

External links 
 Nicolas Rivenq, France Musique
 
 Nicolas Rivenq, Who's who
 Nicolas Rivenq, AllMusic
 Nicolas Rivenq, AllMusic
 Nicolas Rivenq, Operabase
 Nicolas Rivenq, in Rameau's Les Sauvages, YouTube

1958 births
Living people
Singers from London
French operatic baritones